Wayne Michael Primeau (born June 4, 1976) is a Canadian former professional ice hockey player who played in the National Hockey League (NHL). He is the younger brother of Keith Primeau.

Playing career
Primeau was a first round draft pick of the Owen Sound Platers in the Ontario Hockey League (OHL) and played with the Platers for three years from 1992 to 1995. 

He was drafted 17th overall in 1994 by the Buffalo Sabres, where he scored his first NHL goal in his first NHL game against Martin Brodeur of the New Jersey Devils. He was traded to the Tampa Bay Lightning in 2000 and was then traded to the Pittsburgh Penguins on February 1, 2001.

Primeau was acquired by the San Jose Sharks from the Penguins in exchange for Matt Bradley on March 11, 2003. After a career year in 2003–04, Primeau was eligible for group IV unrestricted free agency. However, he decided to re-sign with the Sharks.

Primeau was traded to the Boston Bruins on November 30, 2005, (along with Brad Stuart and Marco Sturm) in exchange for Joe Thornton. In February 2007, the Bruins traded him to the Calgary Flames (again along with Brad Stuart) in exchange for Chuck Kobasew and Andrew Ference.

On July 27, 2009, Primeau was traded to the Toronto Maple Leafs (along with a second round pick in the 2011 NHL Entry Draft) in exchange for forward Colin Stuart, defenceman Anton Strålman and a seventh-round pick in 2012.

Prior to the start of the Maple Leafs' 2010 training camp, Primeau was signed to a professional tryout contract with the Leafs. He was released at the conclusion of training camp on September 26.

Career statistics

See also
Notable families in the NHL

References

External links

1976 births
Living people
Boston Bruins players
Buffalo Sabres draft picks
Buffalo Sabres players
Calgary Flames players
Canadian ice hockey centres
Franco-Ontarian people
National Hockey League first-round draft picks
Oshawa Generals players
Owen Sound Platers players
Pittsburgh Penguins players
Rochester Americans players
San Jose Sharks players
Sportspeople from Scarborough, Toronto
Ice hockey people from Toronto
Tampa Bay Lightning players
Toronto Maple Leafs players